The Phu Kham mine is a large copper mine in the south of Laos in Xaisomboun Province. Phu Kham is one of the largest copper reserves in the world, having estimated reserves of 450 million tonnes of ore grading 0.54% copper, 3.46 million oz of gold, and 30.2 million oz of silver.

References 

Copper mines in Laos